Abul Kalam Azad is a Bangladeshi journalist who is the incumbent Managing Director and Chief Editor of Bangladesh Sangbad Sangstha (BSS), state-run national news agency of Bangladesh. Prior to his appointment at BSS, Azad worked as the Press Secretary to the Prime Minister of Bangladesh.

Early life
Azad was born in Haridia village at Lohajang Upazila in Munshiganj District. His father's name is Habibur Rahman Sikder. After graduating from Dhaka University, he received a diploma in 'advanced journalism' from Moscow. While studying at Dhaka University, he was a member of the central committee of Bangladesh Chhatra League. During the 1969 Mass uprising in East Pakistan, he was Dhaka divisional treasurer of the Sarbadaliya Chhatra Sangram Parishad.

References

Bangladeshi journalists
People from Munshiganj District
Living people
Year of birth missing (living people)